Dagan Yivzori (born October 15, 1985) is an Israeli basketball player who last played for Ironi Nahariya of the Israeli Premier League. He was the 2014 Israeli Basketball Premier League Finals MVP. He also plays for the Israeli national team in the international level.

Yivzori, standing at 1.93 (6 ft 4 in), is considered one of the best sharpshooters in the Israeli League.

Professional career

Early career
Yivzori started his professional career playing for Liga Leumit teams, Maccabi Kiryat Bialik and Hapoel Afula B.C., without leaving his mark.

Hapoel Yokneam/Megido
In 2004, he signed for Liga Artzit (3rd tier) side Hapoel Yokneam/Megido, where he became one of the league's stars. In his second season with Yokneam/Megido, Dagan has achieved a promotion with the team, leading them with averages of 18.4 points, 3.8 rebounds and 3.5 assists. One season later, Dagan led the team into Liga Leumit semifinals and to the State Cup's quarterfinals. In addition, he won the best Israeli award and was elected to the league's all-team.

Hapoel Gilboa/Afula
In 2007–08, Yivzori has firstly played in the first league, signing for Hapoel Gilboa/Afula. The team was relegated at the end of the season.

Hapoel Gilboa Galil
Dagan has stayed in the Israeli Super League signing for Hapoel Gilboa Galil, where he was assigned as the sixth player. He finished the season with averages of 5.5 points in 16 minutes. He played there also for the 2009–10 season. In the summer of 2010, Yivzori signed with Hapoel Holon but was released before the season start because of financial difficulties. In September 2010 he signed back with Gilboa Galil.

He totally played 5 seasons for Gilboa Galil.

Maccabi Haifa

In 2013, Yivzori joined the Israeli league champion Maccabi Haifa. His best game for the Greens was an away win against Hapoel Jerusalem, where he scored 36 points with 6/7 for two points and 7/10 behind the arc. He was the 2014 Israeli Basketball Premier League Finals MVP.

Maccabi Tel Aviv and Hapoel Holon
On 2 July 2015, Yivzori signed with Euroleague-side team Maccabi Tel Aviv, for three years. However, three months into his second year in yellow, with barely any minutes spent on the court, he had his contract untied and signed with Hapoel Holon on 4 January 2017.

Return to Haifa
On July 18, 2017, Yivzori returned to Maccabi Haifa and signed a three-year deal.

Ironi Nahariya
On July 12, 2018, Yivzori parted ways with Haifa and signed with Ironi Nahariya for the 2018–19 season.

Israeli national team
Yivzori has also been a member of the senior Israeli national basketball team. He represented Israel in the EuroBasket 2015 qualification, as well as the EuroBasket 2015 itself.

References

External links
Euroleague.net profile
Israeli Basketball League profile (Hebrew)

1985 births
Living people
Hapoel Gilboa/Afula players
Ironi Nahariya players
Israeli men's basketball players
Israeli Basketball Premier League players
Maccabi Haifa B.C. players
Maccabi Tel Aviv B.C. players
People from Afula
Shooting guards